Great Helmsman is a Chinese honorific title. It most commonly refers to Mao Zedong (1893–1976), Chairman of the Chinese Communist Party and paramount leader of China from 1949 to 1976. It may also refer to:
 Xi Jinping (born 1953), General Secretary of the Chinese Communist Party (paramount leader) since 2012
The Great Helmsman (play), a 2007 play by David Henry Hwang